Sde David (lit. David's Field) is a moshav in southern Israel. Located in Hevel Lakhish, it falls under the jurisdiction of Lakhish Regional Council.

History
The moshav was founded in 1955 by Jewish immigrants from the Moroccan youth movement HaNoar HaTzioni, as part of the effort to settle the region. It was named after Zalman David Levontin, a Russian banker, pioneer of Jewish settlement in the Land of Israel and the founder and director of the Anglo-Palestine Bank (which later became Bank Leumi).

Sde David was founded in 1955 on  land belonging to the  depopulated  Palestinian village of Burayr.

References

Moshavim
Lakhish Regional Council
Populated places established in 1955
Populated places in Southern District (Israel)
1955 establishments in Israel
Moroccan-Jewish culture in Israel